Parapsallus is a genus of true bugs belonging to the family Miridae.

Species:
 Parapsallus vitellinus (Scholtz, 1874)

References

Miridae